The medial patellofemoral ligament is one of the several ligaments on the medial aspect of the knee. It originates on the superomedial aspect of the patella and inserts in the space between the adductor tubercle and the medial femoral epicondyle. Its main function is to prevent lateral displacement of the patella.

The MPFL is the primary stabilizer to lateral displacement of the patella providing approximately 50-60% of restraining force.  Injury to the MPFL is most common during a non-contact twisting action.  The most likely time for the patella to shift laterally is during the first 20-30 degrees of flexion as the quadriceps tighten simultaneously and pull the patella laterally.  Beyond 30 degrees, the quadriceps tendon and patellar ligament pull the patella posterior into the groove of the knee joint making lateral dislocation of the patella unlikely.

Treatment
Initial dislocation recurs about 15-44% of cases, and symptoms continue in about half.  Recurrence of a laterally displaced patella is more common as the incidence of dislocation continues in the affected individual.  Repairing the MPFL can be done surgically through an MPFL reconstruction.  Indications for such are two documented patellar dislocations and exam findings of excessive lateral patellar mobility.

MPFL reconstruction involves attaching two connections to patella and one to the femur.  This reconstruction holds the femur and patella in place.

Ligaments
Ligaments of the lower limb